The Ark of the Covenant, also known as the Ark of the Testimony or the Ark of God, is an alleged artifact believed to be the most sacred relic of the Israelites, which is described as a wooden chest, covered in pure gold, with an elaborately designed lid called the mercy seat. According to the Book of Exodus, the Ark contained the two stone tablets of the Ten Commandments. According to the New Testament Book of Hebrews, it also contained Aaron's rod and a pot of manna.

The biblical account relates that approximately one year after the Israelites' exodus from Egypt, the Ark was created according to the pattern given to Moses by God when the Israelites were encamped at the foot of Mount Sinai. Thereafter, the gold-plated acacia chest was carried by its staves by the Levites approximately 2,000 cubits (approximately ) in advance of the people when on the march. God spoke with Moses "from between the two cherubim" on the Ark's cover.

Biblical account

Construction and description
According to the Book of Exodus, God instructed Moses to build the Ark during his 40-day stay upon Mount Sinai. He was shown the pattern for the tabernacle and furnishings of the Ark, and told that it would be made of shittim wood (also known as acacia wood) to house the Tablets of Stone. Moses instructed Bezalel and Aholiab to construct the Ark.

The Book of Exodus gives detailed instructions on how the Ark is to be constructed. It is to be  cubits in length,  cubits breadth, and  cubits height (approximately ) of acacia wood. Then it is to be gilded entirely with gold, and a crown or molding of gold is to be put around it. Four rings of gold are to be attached to its four corners, two on each side—and through these rings staves of shittim wood overlaid with gold for carrying the Ark are to be inserted; and these are not to be removed. Missing from the account are instructions concerning the thickness of the mercy seat and details about the cherubim other than that the cover be beaten out over the ends of the Ark and that they form the space where God will appear. The Ark is finally to be placed under a veil to conceal it.

Mobile vanguard

The biblical account continues that, after its creation by Moses, the Ark was carried by the Israelites during their 40 years of wandering in the desert. Whenever the Israelites camped, the Ark was placed in a separate room in a sacred tent, called the Tabernacle.

When the Israelites, led by Joshua toward the Promised Land, arrived at the banks of the River Jordan, the Ark was carried in the lead, preceding the people, and was the signal for their advance. During the crossing, the river grew dry as soon as the feet of the priests carrying the Ark touched its waters, and remained so until the priests—with the Ark—left the river after the people had passed over. As memorials, twelve stones were taken from the Jordan at the place where the priests had stood.

During the Battle of Jericho, the Ark was carried around the city once a day for six days, preceded by the armed men and seven priests sounding seven trumpets of rams' horns. On the seventh day, the seven priests sounding the seven trumpets of rams' horns before the Ark compassed the city seven times and, with a great shout, Jericho's wall fell down flat and the people took the city.

After the defeat at Ai, Joshua lamented before the Ark. When Joshua read the Law to the people between Mount Gerizim and Mount Ebal, they stood on each side of the Ark. We next hear of the Ark in Bethel, where it was being cared for by the priest Phinehas, the grandson of Aaron. According to this verse, it was consulted by the people of Israel when they were planning to attack the Benjaminites at the Battle of Gibeah.

Capture by the Philistines

According to the biblical narrative, a few years later the elders of Israel decided to take the Ark out onto the battlefield to assist them against the Philistines, having recently been defeated at the battle of Eben-Ezer. They were again heavily defeated, with the loss of 30,000 men. The Ark was captured by the Philistines and Hophni and Phinehas were killed. The news of its capture was at once taken to Shiloh by a messenger "with his clothes rent, and with earth upon his head". The old priest, Eli, fell dead when he heard it; and his daughter-in-law, bearing a son at the time the news of the Ark's capture was received, named him Ichabod—explained as "The glory has departed Israel" in reference to the loss of the Ark. Ichabod's mother died at his birth.

The Philistines took the Ark to several places in their country, and at each place misfortune befell them. At Ashdod it was placed in the temple of Dagon. The next morning Dagon was found prostrate, bowed down, before it; and on being restored to his place, he was on the following morning again found prostrate and broken. The people of Ashdod were smitten with tumors; a plague of rodents was sent over the land. This may have been the bubonic plague. The affliction of tumours was also visited upon the people of Gath and of Ekron, whither the Ark was successively removed.

Return of the Ark to the Israelites
After the Ark had been among them for seven months, the Philistines, on the advice of their diviners, returned it to the Israelites, accompanying its return with an offering consisting of golden images of the tumors and mice wherewith they had been afflicted. The Ark was set up in the field of Joshua the Beth-shemite, and the Beth-shemites offered sacrifices and burnt offerings. Out of curiosity the men of Beth-shemesh gazed at the Ark; and as a punishment, seventy of them (fifty thousand and seventy in some translations) were struck down by the Lord. The Bethshemites sent to Kirjath-jearim, or Baal-Judah, to have the Ark removed; and it was taken to the house of Abinadab, whose son Eleazar was sanctified to keep it. Kirjath-jearim remained the abode of the Ark for twenty years. Under Saul, the Ark was with the army before he first met the Philistines, but the king was too impatient to consult it before engaging in battle. In 1 Chronicles 13:3 it is stated that the people were not accustomed to consulting the Ark in the days of Saul.

In the days of King David

In the biblical narrative, at the beginning of his reign over the United Monarchy, King David removed the Ark from Kirjath-jearim amid great rejoicing. On the way to Zion, Uzzah, one of the drivers of the cart that carried the Ark, put out his hand to steady the Ark, and was struck dead by God for touching it. The place was subsequently named "Perez-Uzzah", literally , as a result. David, in fear, carried the Ark aside into the house of Obed-edom the Gittite, instead of carrying it on to Zion, and it stayed there for three months.

On hearing that God had blessed Obed-edom because of the presence of the Ark in his house, David had the Ark brought to Zion by the Levites, while he himself, "girded with a linen ephod[...] danced before the Lord with all his might" and in the sight of all the public gathered in Jerusalem, a performance which caused him to be scornfully rebuked by his first wife, Saul's daughter Michal. In Zion, David put the Ark in the tent he had prepared for it, offered sacrifices, distributed food, and blessed the people and his own household. David used the tent as a personal place of prayer.

The Levites were appointed to minister before the Ark. David's plan of building a temple for the Ark was stopped on the advice of the prophet Nathan. The Ark was with the army during the siege of Rabbah; and when David fled from Jerusalem at the time of Absalom's conspiracy, the Ark was carried along with him until he ordered Zadok the priest to return it to Jerusalem.

In Solomon's Temple

According to the Biblical narrative, when Abiathar was dismissed from the priesthood by King Solomon for having taken part in Adonijah's conspiracy against David, his life was spared because he had formerly borne the Ark. Solomon worshipped before the Ark after his dream in which God promised him wisdom.

During the construction of Solomon's Temple, a special inner room, named  ('Holy of Holies'), was prepared to receive and house the Ark; and when the Temple was dedicated, the Ark—containing the original tablets of the Ten Commandments—was placed therein. When the priests emerged from the holy place after placing the Ark there, the Temple was filled with a cloud, "for the glory of the Lord had filled the house of the Lord".

When Solomon married Pharaoh's daughter, he caused her to dwell in a house outside Zion, as Zion was consecrated because it contained the Ark. King Josiah also had the Ark returned to the Temple, from which it appears to have been removed by one of his predecessors (cf. 2 Chronicles 33–34 and 2 Kings 21–23).

In the days of King Hezekiah
King Hezekiah is the last biblical figure mentioned as having seen the Ark. Hezekiah is also known for protecting Jerusalem against the Assyrian Empire by improving the city walls and diverting the waters of the Gihon Spring through a tunnel known today as Hezekiah's Tunnel, which channeled the water inside the city walls to the Pool of Siloam.

In a noncanonical text known as the Treatise of the Vessels, Hezekiah is identified as one of the kings who had the Ark and the other treasures of Solomon's Temple hidden during a time of crisis. This text lists the following hiding places, which it says were recorded on a bronze tablet: (1) a spring named Kohel or Kahal with pure water in a valley with a stopped-up gate; (2) a spring named Kotel (or "wall" in Hebrew); (3) a spring named Zedekiah; (4) an unidentified cistern; (5) Mount Carmel; and (6) locations in Babylon.

To many scholars, Hezekiah is also credited as having written all or some of the Book of Kohelet (Ecclesiastes in the Christian tradition), in particular the famously enigmatic epilogue. Notably, the epilogue appears to refer to the Ark story with references to almond blossoms (i.e., Aaron's rod), locusts, silver, and gold. The epilogue then cryptically refers to a pitcher broken at a fountain and a wheel broken at a cistern.

Although scholars disagree on whether the Pool of Siloam's pure spring waters were used by pilgrims for ritual purification, many scholars agree that a stepped pilgrimage road between the pool and the Temple had been built in the first century CE. This roadway has been partially excavated, but the west side of the Pool of Siloam remains unexcavated.

The Babylonian conquest and aftermath
In 587 BC, the Babylonians destroyed Jerusalem and Solomon's Temple. There is no record of what became of the Ark in the Books of Kings and Chronicles. An ancient Greek version of the biblical third Book of Ezra, 1 Esdras, suggests that Babylonians took away the vessels of the ark of God, but does not mention taking away the Ark:

In Rabbinic literature, the final disposition of the Ark is disputed. Some rabbis hold that it must have been carried off to Babylon, while others hold that it must have been hidden lest it be carried off into Babylon and never brought back. A late 2nd-century rabbinic work known as the  states the opinions of these rabbis that Josiah, the king of Judah, stored away the Ark, along with the jar of manna, and a jar containing the holy anointing oil, the rod of Aaron which budded and a chest given to Israel by the Philistines. This was said to have been done in order to prevent their being carried off into Babylon as had already happened to the other vessels. Rabbi Eliezer and Rabbi Shimon, in the same rabbinic work, state that the Ark was, in fact, taken into Babylon. Rabbi Yehudah, dissenting, says that the Ark was stored away in its own place, meaning somewhere on the Temple Mount.

Service of the Kohathites

The Kohathites were one of the Levite houses from the Book of Numbers. Theirs was the responsibility to care for "the most holy things" in the tabernacle. When the camp, then wandering the Wilderness, set out the Kohathites would enter the tabernacle with Aaron and cover the ark with the screening curtain and "then they shall put on it a covering of fine leather, and spread over that a cloth all of blue, and shall put its poles in place." The ark was one of the items of the tent of meeting that the Kohathites were responsible for carrying.

Samaritan tradition
Samaritan tradition claims that until the split between Samaritanism and Judaism, which arose when the priest Eli stole the Ark of the Covenant and established a rival cult at Shiloh, the Ark of the Covenant had been kept at the sanctuary of YHWH on Mt. Gerizim.

Archaeology
Archaeological evidence shows strong cultic activity at Kiriath-Jearim in the 8th and 7th centuries BC, well after the ark was supposedly removed from there to Jerusalem. In particular, archaeologists found a large elevated podium, associated with the Northern Kingdom and not the Southern Kingdom, which may have been a shrine. Thomas Römer suggests that this may indicate that the ark was not moved to Jerusalem until much later, possibly during the reign of King Josiah (reigned ). He notes that this might explain why the ark featured prominently in the history before Solomon, but not after. Additionally, 2 Chronicles 35:3 indicates that it was moved during King Josiah's reign.

Some scholars believe the story of the Ark was written independently around the 8th century in a text referred to as the "Ark Narrative" and then incorporated into the main biblical narrative just before the Babylonian exile.

Römer also suggests that the ark may have originally carried sacred stones "of the kind found in the chests of pre-Islamic Bedouins" and speculates that these may have been either a statue of Yahweh or a pair of statues depicting both Yahweh and his companion goddess Asherah. In contrast, Scott Noegel has argued that the parallels between the ark and these practices "remain unconvincing" in part because the Bedouin objects lack the ark's distinctive structure, function, and mode of transportation. Specifically, unlike the ark, the Bedouin chests "contained no box, no lid, and no poles," they did not serve as the throne or footstool of a god, they were not overlaid with gold, did not have kerubim figures upon them, there were no restrictions on who could touch them, and they were transported on horses or camels. Noegel suggests that the ancient Egyptian bark is a more plausible model for the Israelite ark, since Egyptian barks had all the features just mentioned. Noegel adds that the Egyptians also were known to place written covenants beneath the feet of statues, proving a further parallel to the placement of the covenental tablets inside the ark.

References in Abrahamic religions

Tanakh

The Ark is first mentioned in the Book of Exodus and then numerous times in Deuteronomy, Joshua, Judges, I Samuel, II Samuel, I Kings, I Chronicles, II Chronicles, Psalms, and Jeremiah.

In the Book of Jeremiah, it is referenced by Jeremiah, who, speaking in the days of Josiah, prophesied a future time, possibly the end of days, when the Ark will no longer be talked about or be made use of again:

Rashi comments on this verse that "The entire people will be so imbued with the spirit of sanctity that God's Presence will rest upon them collectively, as if the congregation itself was the Ark of the Covenant."

Second Book of Maccabees

According to Second Maccabees, at the beginning of chapter 2:

The "mountain from the top of which Moses saw God's promised land" would be Mount Nebo, located in what is now Jordan.

New Testament

In the New Testament, the Ark is mentioned in the Letter to the Hebrews and the Revelation to St. John. Hebrews 9:4 states that the Ark contained "the golden pot that had manna, and Aaron's rod that budded, and the tablets of the covenant." Revelation 11:19 says the prophet saw God's temple in heaven opened, "and the ark of his covenant was seen within his temple."

The contents of the ark are seen by theologians such as the Church Fathers and Thomas Aquinas as personified by Jesus Christ: the manna as the Holy Eucharist; Aaron's rod as Jesus' eternal priestly authority; and the tablets of the Law, as the Lawgiver himself.

Catholic scholars connect this verse with the Woman of the Apocalypse in Revelation 12:2, which immediately follows, and say that the Blessed Virgin Mary is identified as the "Ark of the New Covenant." Carrying the saviour of mankind within her, she herself became the Holy of Holies. This is the interpretation given in the third century by Gregory Thaumaturgus, and in the fourth century by Saint Ambrose, Saint Ephraem of Syria and Saint Augustine. The Catholic Church teaches this in the Catechism of the Catholic Church: "Mary, in whom the Lord himself has just made his dwelling, is the daughter of Zion in person, the Ark of the Covenant, the place where the glory of the Lord dwells. She is 'the dwelling of God[...] with men."

In the Gospel of Luke, the author's accounts of the Annunciation and Visitation are constructed using eight points of literary parallelism to compare Mary to the Ark.

Saint Athanasius, the bishop of Alexandria, is credited with writing about the connections between the Ark and the Virgin Mary: "O noble Virgin, truly you are greater than any other greatness. For who is your equal in greatness, O dwelling place of God the Word? To whom among all creatures shall I compare you, O Virgin? You are greater than them all O (Ark of the) Covenant, clothed with purity instead of gold! You are the Ark in which is found the golden vessel containing the true manna, that is, the flesh in which Divinity resides" (Homily of the Papyrus of Turin).

The Ark in other faiths 

According to Uri Rubin, the Ark of the Covenant has a religious basis in Islam (and the Baha'i faith), which gives it special significance.

Whereabouts
Since its disappearance from the Biblical narrative, there have been a number of claims of having discovered or of having possession of the Ark, and several possible places have been suggested for its location.

Maccabees
2 Maccabees 2:4–10, written around 100 BC, says that the prophet Jeremiah, "being warned by God" before the Babylonian invasion, took the Ark, the Tabernacle, and the Altar of Incense, and buried them in a cave, informing those of his followers who wished to find the place that it should remain unknown "until the time that God should gather His people again together, and receive them unto mercy."

Ethiopia

The Ethiopian Orthodox Tewahedo Church claims to possess the Ark of the Covenant in Axum. The Ark is currently kept under guard in a treasury near the Church of Our Lady Mary of Zion. Replicas of the tablets within the Ark, or Tabots, are kept in every Ethiopian Orthodox Tewahedo Church, and kept in its own holy of holies, each with its own dedication to a particular saint; the most popular of these include Saint Mary, Saint George and Saint Michael.

The Kebra Nagast is often said to have been composed to legitimise the Solomonic dynasty, which ruled the Ethiopian Empire following its establishment in 1270, but this is not the case. It was originally composed in some other language (Coptic or Greek), then translated into Arabic, and translated into Ge'ez in 1321. It narrates how the real Ark of the Covenant was brought to Ethiopia by Menelik I with divine assistance, while a forgery was left in the Temple in Jerusalem. Although the Kebra Nagast is the best-known account of this belief, it predates the document. Abu al-Makarim, writing in the last quarter of the twelfth century, makes one early reference to this belief that they possessed the Ark. "The Abyssinians possess also the Ark of the Covenant", he wrote, and, after a description of the object, describes how the liturgy is celebrated upon the Ark four times a year, "on the feast of the great nativity, on the feast of the glorious Baptism, on the feast of the holy Resurrection, and on the feast of the illuminating Cross."

In his controversial 1992 book The Sign and the Seal, British writer Graham Hancock reports on the Ethiopian belief that the ark spent several years in Egypt before it came to Ethiopia via the Nile River, where it was kept in the islands of Lake Tana for about four hundred years and finally taken to Axum. (Archaeologist John Holladay of the University of Toronto called Hancock's theory "garbage and hogwash"; Edward Ullendorff, a former professor of Ethiopian Studies at the University of London, said he "wasted a lot of time reading it.") In a 1992 interview, Ullendorff says that he personally examined the ark held within the church in Axum in 1941 while a British Army officer. Describing the ark there, he says, "They have a wooden box, but it's empty. Middle- to late-medieval construction, when these were fabricated ad hoc."

On 25 June 2009, the patriarch of the Orthodox Church of Ethiopia, Abune Paulos, said he would announce to the world the next day the unveiling of the Ark of the Covenant, which he said had been kept safe and secure in a church in Axum, Ethiopia. The following day, on 26 June 2009, the patriarch announced that he would not unveil the Ark after all, but that instead he could attest to its current status.

Southern Africa
The Lemba people of South Africa and Zimbabwe have claimed that their ancestors carried the Ark south, calling it the ngoma lungundu or "voice of God", eventually hiding it in a deep cave in the Dumghe mountains, their spiritual home.

On 14 April 2008, in a UK Channel 4 documentary, Tudor Parfitt, taking a literalist approach to the Biblical story, described his research into this claim. He says that the object described by the Lemba has attributes similar to the Ark. It was of similar size, was carried on poles by priests, was not allowed to touch the ground, was revered as a voice of their God, and was used as a weapon of great power, sweeping enemies aside.

In his book The Lost Ark of the Covenant (2008), Parfitt also suggests that the Ark was taken to Arabia following the events depicted in the Second Book of Maccabees, and cites Arabic sources which maintain it was brought in distant times to Yemen. Genetic Y-DNA analyses in the 2000s have established a partially Middle-Eastern origin for a portion of the male Lemba population but no specific Jewish connection.  Lemba tradition maintains that the Ark spent some time in a place called Sena, which might be Sena in Yemen. Later, it was taken across the sea to East Africa and may have been taken inland at the time of the Great Zimbabwe civilization. According to their oral traditions, some time after the arrival of the Lemba with the Ark, it self-destructed. Using a core from the original, the Lemba priests constructed a new one. This replica was discovered in a cave by a Swedish German missionary named Harald von Sicard in the 1940s and eventually found its way to the Museum of Human Science in Harare.

Europe

Rome
The Ark of the Covenant was said to have been kept in the Basilica of St. John Lateran, surviving the pillages of Rome by Alaric I and Gaiseric but lost when the basilica burned.

"Rabbi Eliezer ben José stated that he saw in Rome the mercy-seat of the temple. There was a bloodstain on it. On inquiry he was told that it was a stain from the blood which the high priest sprinkled thereon on the Day of Atonement."

Ireland
At the turn of the 20th century, British Israelites carried out some excavations of the Hill of Tara in Ireland looking for the Ark of the Covenant. The Royal Society of Antiquaries of Ireland (RSAI) campaigned successfully to have them stopped before they destroyed the hill.

In popular culture
Philip Kaufman conceived of the Ark of the Covenant as the main plot device of Steven Spielberg's 1981 adventure film Raiders of the Lost Ark, where it is found by Indiana Jones in the Egyptian city of Tanis in 1936. In early 2020, a prop version made for the film (which does not actually appear onscreen) was featured on Antiques Roadshow.

In the Danish family film The Lost Treasure of the Knights Templar from 2006, the main part of the treasure found in the end is the Ark of the Covenant. The power of the Ark comes from static electricity stored in separated metal plates like a giant Leyden jar.

In Harry Turtledove's novel Alpha and Omega (2019) the ark is found by archeologists, and the characters have to deal with the proven existence of God.

Yom HaAliyah
Yom HaAliyah (Aliyah Day) is an Israeli national holiday celebrated annually on the tenth of the Hebrew month of Nisan to commemorate the Israelites crossing the Jordan River into the Land of Israel while carrying the Ark of the Covenant.

See also

 Copper Scroll
 List of artifacts in biblical archaeology
 The Exodus Decoded (2006 television documentary)
 History of ancient Israel and Judah
 Jewish symbolism
 Mikoshi, a portable Shinto shrine
 Gihon Spring
 Josephus
 Mount Gerizim
 Temple menorah
 Pool of Siloam
 Samaritans
 Siloam Tunnel
 Solomon's Temple

Footnotes

References

Further reading
 Carew, Mairead, Tara and the Ark of the Covenant: A Search for the Ark of the Covenant by British Israelites on the Hill of Tara, 1899-1902. Royal Irish Academy, 2003. 
 Cline, Eric H. (2007), From Eden to Exile: Unravelling Mysteries of the Bible, National Geographic Society, 
 Fisher, Milton C., The Ark of the Covenant: Alive and Well in Ethiopia?. Bible and Spade 8/3, pp. 65–72, 1995.
 Foster, Charles, Tracking the Ark of the Covenant. Monarch, 2007.
 Grierson, Roderick & Munro-Hay, Stuart, The Ark of the Covenant. Orion Books Ltd, 2000. 
 Hancock, Graham, The Sign and the Seal: The Quest for the Lost Ark of the Covenant. Touchstone Books, 1993. 
 Haran, M., The Disappearance of the Ark, IEJ 13 (1963), 46-58
 Hertz, J.H., The Pentateuch and Haftoras. Deuteronomy. Oxford University Press, 1936.
 Hubbard, David (1956) The Literary Sources of the Kebra Nagast Ph.D. dissertation, St. Andrews University, Scotland
 Munro-Hay, Stuart, The Quest For The Ark of The Covenant: The True History of The Tablets of Moses. L. B. Tauris & Co Ltd., 2006. 
 Ritmeyer, L., The Ark of the Covenant: Where It Stood in Solomon's Temple. Biblical Archaeology Review 22/1: 46–55, 70–73, 1996.
 Stolz, Fritz. "Ark of the Covenant." In The Encyclopedia of Christianity, edited by Erwin Fahlbusch and Geoffrey William Bromiley, 125. Vol. 1. Grand Rapids: Wm. B. Eerdmans, 1999.

External links

 Portions of this article have been taken from the Jewish Encyclopedia of 1906. Ark of the Covenant
 The Catholic Encyclopedia, Volume I. Ark of the Covenant
 Smithsonian.com "Keepers of the Lost Ark?"'.
 Shyovitz, David, The Lost Ark of the Covenant. Jewish Virtual Library.

 
Hebrew Bible objects
Hebrew Bible words and phrases
Tabernacle and Temples in Jerusalem
Book of Exodus
Containers
Relics
Chests (furniture)
Individual wooden objects
Gold objects
Epistle to the Hebrews
Lost works of art